Ram Baran Yadav (born 4 February 1948)  is a Nepali politician and physician who served as the first president of Nepal from 23 July 2008 to 29 October 2015, following the declaration of republic in 2008. Previously he served as Minister of Health from 1999 to 2001 and general secretary of the Nepali Congress.

Political life 
Yadav served as Minister of State for Health from 1991 to 1994. He was elected to the House of Representatives in the 1999 election as a candidate of the Nepali Congress, becoming the Minister of Health in the subsequent government.

In May 2007, Yadav's residence in Janakpur was attacked by militants of the Janatantrik Terai Mukti Morcha (JTMM). The JTMM put up a seizure notice at the house, hoisted their flags at it and detonated a bomb. Yadav contested the Dhanusa-5 constituency in the April 2008 Constituent Assembly election and won the seat, obtaining 10,392 votes.

Yadav was elected as the first President of Nepal in a second round of voting on 21 July 2008. He received 308 out of the 590 votes cast in the Constituent Assembly, defeating Ram Raja Prasad Singh, who had been nominated by the Communist Party of Nepal (Maoist), in a second round of voting. Yadav was sworn in as president on 23 July 2008. Chief Justice of Nepal Kedar Prasad Giri administered the oath of office and secrecy to Yadav at Shital Niwas, Rastrapati Bhawan. Yadav also administered oath to Vice-president Parmananda Jha.

Personal life
Yadav began his political career while studying medicine in Calcutta, India. He came in contact with several Nepali politicians who had self-exiled themselves in India, such as B. P. Koirala, Ganesh Man Singh, Subarna Shamsher Rana, Pushpa Lal Shrestha, and Saroj Koirala. Inspired by these leaders, Yadav started engaging himself in politics actively. He championed the cause for multi-party democracy during the referendum held in 1980. While practicing as a physician for several years in Janakpur. He engaged himself in politics as an active cadre of the Nepali Congress Party. He was a rural private practitioner for several years as well as a personal physician to Koirala, the first elected Prime Minister of Nepal, from 1980 to 1982.

Yadav was imprisoned for some time until restoration of multiparty democratic dispensation in Nepal in 1990. Thereafter,  he was elected twice as a Member of the House of Representatives from the Constituency No. 5 of Dhanusa district of Nepal. He was the Minister of State for Health from 1991 to 1994. He again took charge of the Ministry of Health as the Cabinet Minister from 1999 to 2001. Yadav was elected as a Member of the Constituent Assembly from the same constituency of Dhanusa District during the elections held on 10 April 2008.

Yadav discharged various responsibilities in the Nepali Congress Party. He was a member of the Central Working Committee for 15 years, and also a member of Parliamentary Board, and a member of the Discipline Committee of the Party. Before being elected as president, he was General Secretary of the Nepali Congress Party.

Foreign visits
He visited India in 2010 and went to Tirupati Balaji and Chandigarh, where he had received his medical degree. On March 26, 2015, he departed for an official visit to China at the invitation of the Chinese government.

Honours
Ram Baran has received several accolades and honours:

Foreign Honours
: Recipient of the Bangladesh Liberation War Honour (Bangladesh Muktijuddho Sanmanona)

See also
2008 Nepalese presidential election
President of Nepal
List of prime ministers of Nepal

References

|-

1948 births
Living people
Madhesi people
Nepalese Hindus
Nepali Congress politicians from Madhesh Province
People from Dhanusha District
Presidents of Nepal
University of Calcutta alumni
Nepal MPs 1991–1994
Nepal MPs 1999–2002
Members of the 1st Nepalese Constituent Assembly
Nepalese physicians
Candidates for President of Nepal